The Neighborhood is the fifth album by the rock band Los Lobos. It was released in 1990 and includes contributions from, among others, Levon Helm and John Hiatt.

The album peaked at No. 103 on the Billboard 200 in September 1990.

Production
The album followed a period of writer's block, brought on by the success of "La Bamba," and a confusion about what musical direction to go in. The New York Times noted a more prominent blues influence, "in different moods and textures." Some tracks employed session drummers in place of Louie F. Pérez, Jr.

Critical reception

AllMusic called the album "a genuine step forward for a great band, as well as the jumping-off point to their most experimental period." Rolling Stone called it "a bringing-it-all-back-home affair [that] finds a spiritual dimension, a sense of wonder in the course of everyday life." The Washington Post wrote that "the album is a bold claim by these second-generation immigrants that they are Americans, and that all of America's culture belongs to them." Trouser Press called the album "exciting, evocative and highly satisfying." The Chicago Tribune called it "East L.A. soul music, played and sung with utter conviction."

Track listing 
All songs written by David K. Hidalgo and Louie F. Pérez, Jr., except where noted.

Personnel 
 David K. Hidalgo - vocals, electric and acoustic guitars, 6-string bass, tiple, accordion, bajo sexto, violine, Hawaiian steel, koto guitar, drums, percussion
 Cesar J. Rosas - vocals, electric and acoustic guitars, bajo-sexto, huapanguera
 Louie F. Pérez, Jr. - drums, percussion, guitars, jarana, hidalguer
 Conrad R. Lozano - vocals, fender precision and 5-string bass, guitarron, upright bass
 Steve M. Berlin - tenor, baritone and soprano saxophones, organ, clavinet, percussion

Additional personnel
 Jerry Marotta - drums (track 1, 3)
 Danny Timms - organ, wurlitzer, piano (track 1, 12)
 Alex Acuña - percussion, shekere, hand drums (track 1, 3, 4)
 John Hiatt - vocals (track 1, 10)
 Jim Keltner - drums, percussion (track 2, 6, 9, 10, 11, 12, 13)
 Levon Helm - vocals, mandolin (track 2, 5)
 Mitchell Froom - harmonium  (track 4)

Production
 Larry Hirsch - producer, engineer, mixing
 Los Lobos - producer
 Mitchell Froom - producer (track 4)
 Clark Germain - engineer 
 Stacy Baird - engineer
 Brian Soucy - assistant engineer
 Dan Bosworth - assistant engineer 
 Eric Rudd - assistant engineer 
 Joe Schiff - assistant engineer 
 Neal Avron - assistant engineer 
 Tom Nellen - assistant engineer
 Tchad Blake - engineer (track 4)
 Julie Last - assistant engineer (track 4)
 Stephen Marcussen - mastering
 Terry Robertson-Mota - art direction, design
 Louie Perez - art visions
 Carlos Almaraz - paintings
 Max Aguilera-Hellweg - photography

References

1990 albums
Los Lobos albums
Slash Records albums